The Napo sabrewing (Campylopterus villaviscensio) is a Near Threatened species of hummingbird in the "emeralds", tribe Trochilini of subfamily Trochilinae. It is found in Colombia, Ecuador, and Peru.

Taxonomy and systematics

The Napo sabrewing is monotypic.

Description

Males weigh  and females . Both sexes have an almost straight black bill and a white spot behind the eye. The male's crown is glittering golden green and the rest of its upperparts bronzy green. Its throat and chest are dark violet-blue and the rest of its underparts dark gray with green spots. Its central tail feathers are bronze-green and the rest dark blue. Females have entirely emerald green upperparts and gray underparts. Their tail is blue-green with whitish gray tips to the feathers.

Distribution and habitat

The Napo sabrewing is found from southern Colombia through eastern Ecuador into northeastern Peru as far as San Martín Department. It inhabits humid montane forest, elfin forest, and secondary forest.

Behavior

Movement

The Napo sabrewing's movements, if any, are not known.

Feeding

The Napo sabrewing forages for nectar from the understory to the mid-strata of the forest. In addition to nectar it feeds on small insects by hawking from a perch. No details of its diet are known.

Breeding

Napo sabrewings have been noted in breeding condition in October and November, but nothing else is known about the species' breeding phenology.

Vocalization

The Napo sabrewing's song is "a long series of two notes repeated continuously at evenly spaced intervals 'tslip...tseek...tslip...tseek...' or 'trrip...tseek...trrip...tseek'." Its calls include "a single 'chip' or doubled 'chirrip'" that sometimes become a short rattle.

Status

The IUCN has assessed the Napo sabrewing as Near Threatened. It has a "moderately small" range and its unknown population number is believed to be decreasing. The principal threats are mining, logging, and conversion of its forest habitat to agriculture and pasture.

References

Napo sabrewing
Birds of the Ecuadorian Andes
Napo sabrewing
Napo sabrewing
Taxonomy articles created by Polbot